Apuí is a municipality located in the Brazilian state of Amazonas. Its population was 22,359 (2020) and its area is 54,240 km2.

Gold rush

The municipality shot to fame in December 2006, when a Brazilian maths teacher by the name of Ivani Valentim da Silva posted descriptions of miners scooping up thousands of dollars in gold in the area. In just three months, between 3,000 and 10,000 people poured into the area, cutting down trees, diverting streams and digging wildcat mines. The city was nicknamed Eldorado do Juma after the mythical El Dorado.

Conservation

The municipality contains 92% of the  Apuí Mosaic, a jointly-managed collection of conservation units.
It contains the  Sucunduri State Park, created in 2005.
It also contains the  Sucunduri State Forest, a sustainable use conservation unit created in 2005.
It contains 72% of the  Guariba Extractive Reserve, also created in 2005.
It also contains the  Bararati Sustainable Development Reserve, created at the same time.

The municipality contains part of the  Juruena National Park, one of the largest conservation units in Brazil, created by decree on 5 June 2006.
It also contains part of the  Acari National Park created by president Dilma Rousseff in 2016 in the last week before her provisional removal from office.
The municipality contains about 17% of the  Aripuanã National Forest, a sustainable development unit created at the same time.

Transportation
The city is served by Apuí Airport.

References

Sources

1988 establishments in Brazil
Municipalities in Amazonas (Brazilian state)